Irene Mitterstieler (born August 6, 1974) was an Italian luger who competed from the late 1990s to 2005. A natural track luger, she won the bronze medal at the 2003 FIL World Luge Natural Track Championships in Železniki, Slovenia

References
FIL-Luge profile
Natural track World Championships results: 1979-2007 (eiskanal.com)

External links 
 

1974 births
Living people
Italian female lugers
Italian lugers
People from Völs am Schlern
Sportspeople from Südtirol